Beitin is a Palestinian village in the Ramallah and al-Bireh Governorate in the central West Bank, located  northeast of Ramallah along the Ramallah-Nablus road. The Palestinian village of Dura al-Qar' and Ein Yabrud lie to the north, Rammun to the east, Deir Dibwan to the southeast and al-Bireh to the southwest. The Israeli settlement of Beit El is northwest of Beitin.

Geography
There are several springs around Beitin, which is known for its olive, almond, fig and plum groves.

History

Periods of settlement
The site was first settled during the Chalcolithic period.

Sherds from the Early, Intermediate, Middle and Late Bronze Age, as well as the Iron Age I and II, the Persian, Hellenistic, Roman, the Byzantine and Crusader/Ayyubid periods have been found.

The village was abandoned after the 1187 defeat of the Crusaders at the hands of Sultan Saladin and the ensuing destruction of Christian sites.

At the ruins of the Crusader watchtower (al-Burj), residential remains from the Mamluk period were discovered.

The village was only reestablished in the 19th century under Ottoman rule.

Chalcolithic period
Human settlement at the site of Beitin dates back to the Chalcolithic period. Archaeological excavations in 1950 uncovered flint tools, pottery and animal bones from that time.

Bronze Age
In the Early Bronze Age (around 3200 BCE) normally nomadic populations settled in the area. Canaanite tombs, houses and olive presses were discovered to the north and southeast of the village. The remains of a Canaanite temple were also excavated by archaeologists.

In the Middle Bronze Age (around 1750 BCE) its status was elevated from a village to a fortified Canaanite town which is believed to be biblical Luz. Two city gates dating to this period have been excavated, one in the northeast and the other northwest of the wall. A second temple was built in Luz during this period, but was destroyed as a result of an earthquake.

Iron Age

Biblical reference
Beitin has been identified as the biblical Bethel, the site where Jacob slept and dreamt of the angels coming up and down a ladder. Some scholars believe that Bethel was located on the site of the ruins surrounding Beitin. According to Genesis, Jacob encountered God near Luz and renamed the place Bethel or "House of God." However, based on the biblical Book of Joshua, which says mibBeit-el Luzah ("from Bethel to Luz"), Luz and Bethel may have been two different places.

Byzantine period
In Byzantine times, Bethel held annual festivals on October 18. The population was Eastern Orthodox Christian and  monks from the Sinai Peninsula, particularly Zosimas of Palestine, were known to have visited the town.

Early Muslim period
The church fell into ruin after the Islamic Rashidun army conquered the area.

Crusader & Ayyubid periods
The church was rebuilt by the Crusaders in the 12th century.  During the Crusader period, the village was given as fief by Baldwin V of Jerusalem to the Church of the Holy Sepulchre. After the Crusaders were defeated by the Ayyubid forces of Saladin in 1187, the church was destroyed and the village was abandoned.

Ottoman period

The region had been part of the Ottoman Empire since 1517 and after Beitin was reestablished, the village came under the administration of the Mutasarrif ("Governorate") of Jerusalem. In the early 19th century, people from Transjordan and other places migrated to Beitin and built a mosque near the site of the old church.

In 1838 Edward Robinson noted Beitin   as a place "in ruins or deserted," located immediately north of Jerusalem.

In 1863  Victor Guérin found  the village to  have 400 inhabitants, while an Ottoman village list from around 1870 showed that Beitin had an adult male population of 140, in a total of 55 houses (thus excluding women and children).

In 1882 the PEF's Survey of Western Palestine described Beitin as a village "built on the side of a flat spur which rises slightly on the north. On the south-east is a flat dell, with good fig and pomegranate gardens, and there are other fig-trees round the village and among the houses. The cottages have a ruinous appearance, with rough stone walls. There is one square white house in two stories, which is visible from a great distance. The ground is very open, and the slopes gentle; the village slopes down gradually south-east. The surrounding ground is quite bare of trees, of white chalk, very barren and stony on the south; of hard limestone cropping up on the north; the fields divided off by low drystone walls.	The contrast of the grey rocks, the red ploughland and the dark green figs is very striking. The remains of a good-sized tower exist towards the north, and on the south the walls of a church of Crusading date, once dedicated to St. Joseph. The population is stated at 400. The place is supplied from a fine spring on the south, which wells up in a circular basin. The spring is double, and was surrounded with a large reservoir, 314 feet long north-west and south-east, by 217 feet; of massive stones. The eastern and southern walls are standing about 10 feet high. The spring is perennial..."

In 1896 the population of Betin was estimated to be about 360 persons.

In 1907, small gardens and a few old tombs were found in the vicinity, and the  Muslim population was known for its strength and fearlessness.

British Mandate period

In the 1922 census of Palestine conducted by the British Mandate authorities, Baitin had a population of 446; all  Muslims, increasing at the time of the 1931 census to 566, still all Muslim, in 135 houses.

In the 1945 statistics the population was 690 Muslims, while the total land area was 4,764 dunams, according to an official land and population survey. Of this, 1,348 were allocated for plantations and irrigable land, 1,853 for cereals, while 38 dunams were classified as built-up areas.

Jordanian period
In the wake of the 1948 Arab–Israeli War, and after the 1949 Armistice Agreements, Beitin came under Jordanian rule.

In 1961, a Jordanian census found the population to be 1,017.

Post-1967
After the Six-Day War in 1967, Beitin has, with the rest of the West Bank, been held under Israeli occupation. The population in the 1967 census conducted by the Israeli authorities was 958, of whom 134  originated from the Israeli territory.

After  the 1995 accords, 19,1% of the village land is classified as  Area B, while the remaining 80.9% is defined as  Area C land (full Israeli control). Beitin village land has also been taken in order to construct the illegal Israeli outpost Givat Asaf.

On 19 December 2011, Israeli settlers were accused of carrying out a second price tag attack in only four days, in which five Palestinian-owned cars were burnt and the walls of several houses were sprayed with graffiti. During the first incident (15 December 2011), the assailants not only vandalized a mosque, but also attacked an IDF military base in the West Bank, injuring a top Israeli commander. According to witnesses of the second incident, the Israeli army dispersed the settlers without arresting any of them, presumably also those who attacked the Israeli commander, although four days earlier the incident had prompted Israeli Prime-Minister, Benjamin Netanyahu, to say: "We won't let them attack our soldiers. We won't let them ignite a religious war with our neighbors. We won't let them desecrate mosques. We won't let them harm Jews or Arabs."

Landmarks

Church ruins
The ruins of the Byzantine church are known in Arabic as "al-Muqater" or "Khirbet al-Kenise" ("Ruins of the Church"). According to  Röhricht, when the Crusaders arrived, they found a ruined church. They built another and placed it first  under the Abbey of St. Joseph of Arimathea, later  under the Canons of the Holy Sepulcher. The ruins of the church were drawn in the 1880s.

Tower ruins ("al-Burj")

They were also drawn in the 1880s. The ruins of the Burj are about 1 meter tall, and apparently built  on the older  ruins of a Byzantine monastery. Some have believed that it was   constructed on the site where Abraham built an altar. According to biblical scholar Edward Robinson who visited Palestine in the 19th century, al-Burj Beitin consisted of dilapidated stones that used to form part of a fortress and a Greek church. Al-Burj was used as a watch tower by the Crusaders.

Demographics

In 1997, Palestinian refugees accounted for exactly 30% of the population, which was 1,510 at the time.

According to the Palestinian Central Bureau of Statistics (PCBS), Beitin had a population of over 3,050 inhabitants in 2006. In 2007, a PCBS census recorded a  population of 2,143 (1,128 men and 1,015 women). There were 717 homes in the village and the average household size consisted of 4.9 family members.

References

Bibliography

 (p. 284)

 
 
 
  

 
   
  (pp. 205-206)

External links
Welcome To Beitin
Survey of Western Palestine, Map 14:   IAA,  Wikimedia commons  
Beitin (fact sheet),  Applied Research Institute–Jerusalem (ARIJ)
Beitin (village profile), ARIJ
Beitin (aerial photo), ARIJ

Bronze Age sites in the State of Palestine
Villages in the West Bank
Hebrew Bible places
Canaanite cities
Municipalities of the State of Palestine